John Nicholson (1765 – January 20, 1820) was a United States representative from New York. Born in Herkimer, he received a limited education, studied law, and was admitted to the bar and practiced. He held various local offices and was elected as a Democratic-Republican to the Eleventh Congress, holding office from March 4, 1809 – March 3, 1811. In 1820 he died in Herkimer.

References

1765 births
1820 deaths
People from Herkimer, New York
New York (state) lawyers
Democratic-Republican Party members of the United States House of Representatives from New York (state)
19th-century American lawyers